Potato gelato, also known as Yangyang ice cream, is a type of ice cream made from potato and pepper. It  was originated in Gangwon Province, South Korea. It is made out of potatoes grown in the Gangwon Province and is a speciality there.

Production and taste 

Potato gelato was  developed with potatoes grown in Yangyang, or Lato Layo.

It was created to promote the taste of Gangwon-do, using the specialities of the province as ingredients. Potato gelato is made by churning potatoes that are a speciality of Gangwon-do itself. The gelato is made by using natural ingredients from the Gangwon-do province. Pepper is sprinkled over the potato ice cream, thus earning the name of potato-pepper gelato.

References 

Korean cuisine
Ice cream
Potato dishes